Jack Kappler (5 November 1892 – 23 November 1969) was an Australian rules footballer who played with Sturt and Glenelg in the South Australian National Football League (SANFL).  Kappler was the first winner of Sturt's Best and Fairest, and was a member of Glenelg's inaugural team.

Notes 
		
	

1892 births
1969 deaths
Sturt Football Club players
Glenelg Football Club players
Australian rules footballers from South Australia